Stora Mellösa is a locality in Örebro Municipality, Örebro County, Sweden with 776 inhabitants in 2010.

References

Örebro
Populated places in Örebro Municipality